The 2015 World Snooker Championship (officially the 2015 Betfred World Snooker Championship) was a professional snooker tournament which took place from 18 April to 4 May 2015 at the Crucible Theatre in Sheffield, England. It was the 39th consecutive year that the World Snooker Championship had been held at the Crucible, and was the final ranking event of the 2014–15 snooker season. Sports betting company Betfred sponsored the event for the first time in three years, having previously done so from 2009 to 2012. The top sixteen players in the snooker world rankings were placed into the draw, and another sixteen players qualified for the event at a tournament taking place from 8 to 15 April 2015 at the Ponds Forge International Sports Centre, Sheffield.

Mark Selby was the defending champion, having defeated Ronnie O'Sullivan in the 2014 final. Selby lost 9–13 in the second round to event debutant Anthony McGill, and became the 16th first-time champion unable to defend his title at the venue. Shaun Murphy, the 2005 winner, met Stuart Bingham in the final. Bingham, who was given odds of 50–1 to win the tournament by bookmakers before the start of the tournament, defeated Murphy 18–15 in the final to win the first world title of his 20-year professional career. Aged 38, Bingham became the oldest player to win the title since Ray Reardon in 1978.

The tournament featured 86 century breaks, a record for the championship, beating the 83 scored in 2009. The highest break was 145, achieved by both Bingham and Neil Robertson. The event had a prize fund of £1,364,000, the winner receiving £300,000.

Overview

The World Snooker Championship is an annual cue sport tournament and the official professional world championship of the game of snooker. Founded in the late 19th century by British Army soldiers stationed in India, the sport was originally played in the United Kingdom. In modern times, it has been played worldwide, especially in East and Southeast Asia nations such as China, Hong Kong and Thailand.

The world championship sees professional players compete in one-on-one snooker matches in a single-elimination format, each played over several . The player participating in the championship are selected through a mix of the snooker world rankings, and a pre-tournament qualification round. The first world championship in 1927 was won by Joe Davis, the final being held in Camkin's Hall, Birmingham, England. Since 1977, the event has been held at the Crucible Theatre in Sheffield, England. , Stephen Hendry and  Ronnie O’Sullivan are the event's most successful participants in the modern era, having both won the championship seven times. Englishman Mark Selby had won the previous year's championship by defeating fellow countryman Ronnie O'Sullivan in the final 18–14. The winner of the 2015 event earned prize money of £300,000, from a total pool of £1,364,000. The event was sponsored by sports betting company Betfred, who had also done so for the event from 2009 to 2012.

Format
The 2015 World Snooker Championship was held from 18 April to 4 May 2015 in Sheffield, England. The tournament was the last of 11 rankings events in the 2014–15 snooker season on the World Snooker Tour. It featured a 32-player main draw that took place at the Crucible Theatre, as well as a 128-player qualifying draw that was played at the 8 and 15 April 2015 at the Ponds Forge International Sports Centre, finishing three days before the start of the main tournament. This was the 39th consecutive year that the tournament had been held at the Crucible, and it was the 47th successive world championship to be contested through the knockout format after reverting from a challenge match system in the 1960s.

The top 16 players in the world rankings automatically qualified for the main draw as seeded players. Selby was seeded first overall as the defending champion, and the remaining 15 seeds were allocated based on the world rankings, released after the penultimate event of the season, the China Open. The number of frames needed to win a match increased with each proceeding round of the main draw, starting with best-of-19-frames matches in the first round, leading up to the final which was played as a best-of-35-frames match.

Prize fund
The prize fund of the event was raised to £1,364,000 from the previous year's £1,214,000. The breakdown of prize money for this year is shown below:

Winner: £300,000
Runner-up: £125,000
Semi-final: £60,000
Quarter-final: £30,000
Last 16: £20,000
Last 32: £12,000
Last 48: £9,000
Last 80: £6,000
Non-televised highest break: £1,000
Televised highest break: £10,000
Total: £1,364,000

Participant summary
The event featured 144 participants, 128 competing in qualifying alongside 16 invited players. The top 16 seeds automatically qualified for the main draw based on the snooker world rankings before the tournament. Ali Carter was seeded 13, despite being ranked 31, because his seeding had been frozen while he underwent treatment for cancer. This meant that Michael White, ranked 16, had to play in the qualifying tournament. For the first time, players ranked 17 to 32 had to win three qualifying matches, rather than one.

Ten former world champions competed in the tournament. Peter Ebdon, Steve Davis, and Ken Doherty lost in the qualifying rounds, but Graeme Dott qualified for the main stages. Six other former champions (John Higgins, Shaun Murphy, Ronnie O'Sullivan, Neil Robertson, Mark Selby, and Mark Williams) automatically qualified by virtue of their top 16 rankings. Davis became the first player to compete in a total of 100 World Championship matches, including qualifiers, as he lost 1–10 to Kurt Maflin. Ten-time women's world champion Reanne Evans attempted to become the first woman to reach the televised stages of the World Championship, but she lost 8–10 to Doherty in the first qualifying round.

Summary

First round

The first round was played as the best of 19 frames held over two  between 18 and 23 April. First-round debutants at the championship were England's Craig Steadman, and Stuart Carrington, Scotland's Anthony McGill, and Norway's Kurt Maflin. McGill and Carrington had both played at the Crucible before, in the Junior Pot Black in 2006. Mark Selby led 6–3 and 8–4 against Maflin, but trailed after his opponent won five frames in a row. Selby recovered from 8–9 down to clinch a 10–9 win. In his match against Steadman, O'Sullivan risked a sanction for removing a pair of uncomfortable shoes and playing briefly in his socks, before borrowing a replacement pair of shoes from tournament director Mike Ganley. Carter, who had missed the first five months of the season after extensive treatment for cancer, won his match 10–5 against Alan McManus.

Higgins recorded seven breaks over 50 in a 10–5 victory over Robert Milkins. Marco Fu and Jimmy Robertson were tied at 5–5, Fu winning five of the next six frames for a 10–6 win. Mark Davis built a 4–0 lead against Ding Junhui, but won only three out of the next thirteen, and lost 7–10. Mark Allen, trailing 1–3, took the next nine frames to progress 10–3 at the expense of Day. Hawkins led Matthew Selt 7–2 and 9–4, but had to win the match in a deciding frame as Selt won the next five frames. Stevens, who had been defeated in the 2000 final by Williams, eliminated Williams at the 2015 event, completing a 10–2 victory.

Zhang Anda, who at 98th in the rankings was the lowest ranked qualifier, lost the first seven frames in his match against Joe Perry. He won only four frames, and lost 4–10. Neil Robertson compiled a 143  in the third frame of his 10–2 defeat of Jamie Jones. Murphy, who declared that he was planning to take an attacking approach to matches, as he had in winning the 2005 tournament, won 10–3 against Hull. Robbie Williams led 5–4 against Stuart Bingham after their first session, which featured breaks over 50 in each of the frames, but lost 7–10. Dott defeated Ricky Walden 10–8 after the pair had been level at 4–4 and 7–7. Judd Trump completed a 10–6 win against Carrington with a break of 109 in the 16th frame.

Second round
The second round was played as the best of 25 frames, held over three sessions between 23 and 27 April. Selby and McGill were tied at 4–4 after their opening session, but McGill led 10–6 after the second. He later won the match 13–9, making Selby the 16th first-time champion who failed to defend his title since the tournament moved to the Crucible in 1977, succumbing to what has become known as the 'Crucible curse'. Ding lost five of the first six frame in his match against Higgins but won the match 13–9 to reach only his third quarter-final in nine years. Higgins praised Ding's positional play after the match, crediting it as the best since Steve Davis.

Barry Hawkins trailed Allen 8–11, but won five straight frames to win the match 13–11. Allen commented that his opponent "froze [him] out", and Hawkins suggested the win would strengthen him going forward. Bingham reached his second Crucible quarter-final, winning seven out of the last eight frames to defeat Dott 13–5. Three of the other four-second round matches ended with 13–5 wins for O'Sullivan over Matthew Stevens, Murphy over Perry, and Robertson over Carter. Judd Trump defeated Fu 13–8. Robertson compiled a break of 145 in the last frame of his match against Carter.

Quarter-finals
The quarter-finals were played on 28 and 29 April, as the best of 25 frames, held over three sessions. Trump defeated Ding 13–4 after leading 6–2 and 12–4 after the first two sessions to reach his third World Championship semi-final. He commented that "he won't get beaten" if he continued to play in the same manor for the rest of the tournament. Murphy led the last remaining qualifier McGill  9–7, and won four of the next five to win 13–8 and reach the semi-finals for the first time since 2009. Bingham made the joint highest break of the tournament in the second round match against O'Sullivan. He reached the first career semi-final after completing 13–9 victory over tournament favourite O'Sullivan, who had beaten Bingham 13–4 at the same stage of the tournament two years before. A controversial incident occurred in the fifth frame of the match, when O'Sullivan placed his chalk on the table and used it to line up a shot. Referee Terry Camilleri did not penalise O'Sullivan, even though the rules of snooker call for a seven-point foul if a player uses an object to measure gaps or distances. The referee's handling of the incident was questioned from the commentary box by former world champion Doherty and on Twitter by former tour referee Michaela Tabb. Bingham commented that he had been in tears after the match, calling it "unbelievable".

In the last quarter-final match, Hawkins defeated Robertson 13–12 to reach the semi-finals for a third consecutive year. Hawkins and Robertson produced four century breaks each to equal the record of eight centuries in one match, a new record for a 25-frame match. Their encounter also included the longest frame in the 2015 tournament to that point, at 70 minutes and 22 seconds.

Semi-finals
The semi-finals were played between 30 April and 2 May, as the best of 33 frames, held over four sessions. All four world championship semi-finalists were English, of whom, Murphy was the only former winner of the event to reach the last four. Murphy took a 6–2 lead over Hawkins in the first session and extended it to 13–3 after the second. Hawkins won the third session, taking five out of eight frames, but trailed 16–8. Murphy wrapped up a 17–9 victory in the final session to reach the third world championship final of his career, after 2005 and 2008. Murphy commented that he was "blown away" at reaching the final of the event again. With five century breaks from Murphy and three from Hawkins, the match equalled the record for the most centuries in a professional match at the Crucible.

In a much closer encounter, Bingham led Trump 5–3 after the first session, 9–7 after the second, and 13–11 after the third. From 14 to 16 down, Trump produced two consecutive century breaks to force a deciding frame. Trump had the first chance in the final frame, but suffered a  allowing Bingham to prevail and defeat Trump 17–16 and reach his first World Championship final. Bingham commented ""It's unbelievable, I cant believe I'm in the world final" Trump commented that despite Bingham playing well, it was "tough to take, really. I needed one good chance. If I’d missed the pot normally then fair play but the kick threw it off line... I feel it’s been a little bit taken away from me."

Final

The final was held on 3 and 4 May as the best of 35 frames, across four sessions. At the age of 38, Bingham was the oldest first-time finalist at the Crucible since 45-year-old Ray Reardon in 1978, although Reardon had already won five world titles at other venues by that point in his career. It was the third appearance in the final for Murphy, who won the title in 2005 with an 18–16 victory over Stevens and was runner-up in 2009 when he lost 9–18 to Higgins. The final was refereed for the first time by Olivier Marteel, from Koksijde in West Flanders, Belgium, who had previously officiated on the semi-final the previous year. He was also the first Belgian to take charge of a World Championship final, and the second referee from continental Europe to do so, after Jan Verhaas.

To open the final, Murphy took a 3–0 lead, but Bingham fought back to end the session all-square at 4–4. In the second session of nine frames, Murphy began strongly, winning four consecutive frames to move 8–4 ahead, but Bingham won four of the next five to reduce Murphy's lead to 9–8 overnight. Bingham's break of 123 in the 14th frame was the 84th century break compiled at the Crucible in 2015, breaking the previous record of 83 centuries set in 2009. In the third session, Bingham won six of the eight frames to move into a 14–11 lead. In the 20th frame, Bingham attempted a maximum break, potting 14 reds and 14 blacks before missing the final red. Although Murphy won four of the first five frames in the final session to draw level at 15–15, Bingham won the 64-minute 31st frame to go 16–15 in front, and then added two more frames for an 18–15 victory and his first world title.

Bingham had odds of 50–1 to win before the tournament. The achievement made him the oldest player to win the title since Reardon in 1978. He was the third oldest winner in Crucible history after Reardon in 1978 and John Spencer who was 41 in 1977. Winning the title also took him to a career high of second in the world rankings. The final was noted for its high standard of break-building, with 6 centuries and 24 more over 50 in the 33 frames played.

Main draw
Shown below are the results for each round. Numbers in brackets denote player seedings; players in bold denote match winners. The draw for the first round took place at Hallamshire Golf Club on 16 April 2015, one day after the end of the last qualifying round.

Qualifying
The three qualifying rounds took place between 8 and 15 April 2015 at the Ponds Forge International Sports Centre in Sheffield, England. All matches were played as the best-of-19 frames.

Round 1

Round 2

Round 3

Century breaks

Televised stage centuries
There were 86 century breaks in the televised stage of the World Championship. For every century break made during the 17-day championship in Sheffield, the title sponsor, Betfred, pledged to donate £200 to World Snooker's official charity, the Bluebell Wood Children's Hospice; in line with the sponsor's declaration, the donation was rounded up to £25,000 as at least 70 centuries were achieved. Neil Robertson and Bingham each compiled a break of 145, the highest breaks achieved in the tournament.

 145, 143, 142, 141, 133, 130, 129, 119, 115, 115, 109  Neil Robertson
 145, 123, 112, 106, 105, 104, 102, 102, 102, 100  Stuart Bingham
 139, 118, 116, 110, 104, 103, 100  Ronnie O'Sullivan
 138, 127, 125, 121, 121, 121, 111, 106, 106, 105, 105, 101, 100  Shaun Murphy
 137, 125, 122  Anthony McGill
 135, 109  Ding Junhui
 135, 104  Ricky Walden
 133, 129, 127, 113, 111, 111, 109, 108, 108, 102  Judd Trump
 132  Zhang Anda
 131, 109, 108, 108, 108, 104, 104, 103, 103, 102  Barry Hawkins

 131  Joe Perry
 127  Ali Carter
 124, 120, 108, 101  Mark Selby
 120  Marco Fu
 115, 111  Matthew Stevens
 115, 109, 101  Mark Allen
 109, 102  Matthew Selt
 106  Jimmy Robertson
 106  John Higgins
 106  Mark Davis

Qualifying stage centuries
There were 83 century breaks in the qualifying stage of the World Championship: Three players, Tom Ford, Craig Steadman and David Morris each made the highest break of qualifying, 140.

 140, 136, 123, 104  Tom Ford
 140, 116  Craig Steadman
 140  David Morris
 139, 138, 126, 125, 112  Robin Hull
 139, 114  Graeme Dott
 137, 134, 132  Zhang Anda
 135  Tony Drago
 134, 134  Andrew Higginson
 134, 109  Sam Baird
 134  Scott Donaldson
 133, 100  Yu Delu
 132, 111  Mark Davis
 131, 123  Thepchaiya Un-Nooh
 131, 106  Mark King
 131  Xiao Guodong
 130, 123  David Gilbert
 129, 120  Dechawat Poomjaeng
 129  Ben Woollaston
 127  Anthony McGill
 125, 110, 106, 102  Fergal O'Brien
 122, 108, 100  Kurt Maflin
 122  Tian Pengfei
 122  Jamie Jones
 120, 118  Adam Duffy
 120, 110  Jack Lisowski
 117  Igor Figueiredo
 116  Michael White
 116  Jamie Burnett
 115, 113, 110, 103  Liang Wenbo
 115  Ryan Day
 115  Liam Highfield
 113, 100  Rod Lawler
 113  Li Hang
 113  Joe Swail
 111, 103  Jimmy Robertson
 110  Alan McManus
 108  Zhou Yuelong
 108  Noppon Saengkham
 107  Chris Wakelin
 106  Peter Lines
 106  Jimmy White
 105, 104  Robert Milkins
 105  Ashley Carty
 105  Stuart Carrington
 101  Michael Leslie
 101  Michael Holt
 101  Matthew Selt
 101  Robbie Williams
 100  Thanawat Thirapongpaiboon
 100  Luca Brecel
 100  Darryl Hill

Notes

References

External links

2015
World Championship
2015 in English sport
Sports competitions in Sheffield
April 2015 sports events in the United Kingdom
May 2015 sports events in the United Kingdom